The Fraileys Formation or Fraileys Shale is a geologic formation in Illinois. It preserves fossils dating back to the Carboniferous period.

See also

 List of fossiliferous stratigraphic units in Illinois
 List of fossiliferous stratigraphic units in Kentucky

References
 

Carboniferous Illinois
Carboniferous southern paleotropical deposits